Ivan's Childhood, sometimes released as My Name Is Ivan in the US, is a 1962 Soviet war drama film directed by Andrei Tarkovsky. Co-written by Mikhail Papava, Andrei Konchalovsky and an uncredited Tarkovsky, it is based on Vladimir Bogomolov's 1957 short story "Ivan". The film features child actor Nikolai Burlyayev along with Valentin Zubkov, Evgeny Zharikov, Stepan Krylov, Nikolai Grinko, and Tarkovsky's wife Irma Raush.

Ivan's Childhood tells the story of orphaned boy Ivan, whose parents were killed by the invading German forces, and his experiences during World War II. Ivan's Childhood was one of several Soviet films of its period, such as The Cranes Are Flying and Ballad of a Soldier, that looked at the human cost of war and did not glorify the war experience as did films produced before the Khrushchev Thaw. In a 1962 interview, Tarkovsky stated that in making the film he wanted to "convey all [his] hatred of war", and that he chose childhood "because it is what contrasts most with war."

Ivan's Childhood was Tarkovsky's first feature film. It won him critical acclaim and made him internationally known. It won the Golden Lion at the Venice Film Festival in 1962 and the Golden Gate Award at the San Francisco International Film Festival in 1962. The film was also selected as the Soviet entry for the Best Foreign Language Film at the 36th Academy Awards, but was not accepted as a nominee. Famous filmmakers such as Ingmar Bergman, Sergei Parajanov and Krzysztof Kieślowski praised the film and cited it as an influence on their work.

Plot
The film is mainly set at the front during World War II, where the Soviet army is fighting the invading German Wehrmacht. The film features a non-linear plot with frequent flashbacks.

After a brief dream sequence, Ivan Bondarev, a 12-year-old Russian boy, wakes up and crosses a war-torn landscape to a swamp, then swims across a river. On the other side, he is seized by Russian soldiers and brought to the young Lieutenant Galtsev, who interrogates him. The boy insists that he call "Number 51 at Headquarters" and report his presence. Galtsev is reluctant, but when he eventually makes the call, he is told by Lieutenant-Colonel Gryaznov to give the boy pencil and paper to make his report, which will be given the highest priority, and to treat him well. Through a series of dream sequences and conversations between different characters, it is revealed that Ivan’s mother and sister (and probably his father, a border guard) have been killed by German soldiers. He got away and joined a group of partisans. When the group was surrounded, they put him on a plane. After the escape, he was sent to a boarding school, but he ran away and joined an army unit under the command of Gryaznov.

Burning for revenge, Ivan insists on fighting on the front line. Taking advantage of his small size, he is successful on reconnaissance missions. Gryaznov and the other soldiers grow fond of him and want to send him to a military school. They give up their idea when Ivan tries to run away and rejoin the partisans. He is determined to avenge the death of his family and others, such as those killed at the Maly Trostenets extermination camp (which he mentions that he has seen).

A subplot involves Captain Kholin and his aggressive advances towards a pretty army nurse, Masha, and Galtsev's own undeclared and probably shared feelings for her. Much of the film is set in a room where the officers await orders and talk, while Ivan awaits his next mission. On the walls are scratched the last messages of doomed prisoners of the Germans.

Finally, Kholin and Galtsev ferry Ivan across the river late at night. He disappears through the swampy forest. The others return to the other shore after cutting down the bodies of two Soviet scouts hanged by the Germans.

The final scenes then switch to Berlin under Soviet occupation after the fall of the Third Reich. Captain Kholin has been killed in action. Galtsev finds a document showing that Ivan was caught and hanged by the Germans. As Galtsev enters the execution room, a final flashback of Ivan's childhood shows the young boy running across a beach after a little girl in happier times. The final image is of a dead tree on the beach.

Cast
Nikolai Burlyayev as Ivan Bondarev
Valentin Zubkov as Capt. Kholin
Evgeny Zharikov as Lt. Galtsev
Stepan Krylov as Cpl. Katasonov
Valentina Malyavina as Masha
Nikolai Grinko as Lt. Col. Gryaznov
Dmitri Milyutenko as Old Man
Irma Raush as Ivan's mother
Andrei Konchalovsky as Soldier

Production
Ivan's Childhood was Tarkovsky's first feature film, shot two years after his diploma film The Steamroller and the Violin. The film is based on the 1957 short story Ivan by Vladimir Bogomolov, which was translated into more than twenty languages. It drew the attention of the screenwriter Mikhail Papava, who changed the story line and made Ivan more of a hero. Papava called his screenplay Second Life. In this screenplay Ivan is not executed, but sent to the concentration camp Majdanek, from where he is freed by the advancing Soviet army. The final scene of this screenplay shows Ivan meeting one of the officers of the army unit in a train compartment. Bogomolov, unsatisfied with this ending, intervened and the screenplay was changed to reflect the source material.

Mosfilm gave the screenplay to the young film director Eduard Abalov. Shooting was aborted and the film project was terminated in December 1960, since the first version of the film drew heavy criticism from the arts council, and the quality was deemed unsatisfactory and unusable. In June 1961 the film project was given to Tarkovsky, who had applied for it after being told about Ivan's Childhood by cinematographer Vadim Yusov. Work on the film resumed in the same month. The film was shot for the most part near Kanev at the Dnieper River.

Tarkovsky continued his collaboration with cinematographer Vadim Yusov, who was the cameraman in Tarkovsky's diploma film The Steamroller and the Violin. Nikolai Burlyayev had played a role in Andrei Konchalovsky's student film The Boy and the Pigeon. Konchalovsky was a friend and fellow student of Tarkovsky at the State Institute of Cinematography (VGIK), and thus Burlyayev was also cast for the role of Ivan. He had to pass several screen tests, but according to Burlyayev it is unclear whether anyone else auditioned for the role. Burlyayev would later play Boriska in Tarkovsky's second feature, Andrei Rublev.

Reception

Ivan's Childhood was one of Tarkovsky's most commercially successful films, selling 16.7 million tickets in the Soviet Union. Tarkovsky himself was displeased with some aspects of the film; in his book Sculpting in Time, he writes at length about subtle changes to certain scenes that he regrets not implementing.

However, the film received numerous awards and international acclaim on its release, winning the Golden Lion at the Venice Film Festival. It attracted the attention of many intellectuals, including Ingmar Bergman who said, "My discovery of Tarkovsky's first film was like a miracle. Suddenly, I found myself standing at the door of a room the keys of which had, until then, never been given to me. It was a room I had always wanted to enter and where he was moving freely and fully at ease."

Jean-Paul Sartre wrote an article on the film, defending it against a highly critical article in the Italian newspaper L'Unita written by Alberto Moravia and saying that it was one of the most beautiful films he had ever seen. In a later interview, Tarkovsky (who did not consider the film to be among his best work) admitted to agreeing with Moravia's criticisms at the time, finding Sartre's defense "too philosophical and speculative". Filmmakers Sergei Parajanov and Krzysztof Kieślowski praised the film and cited it as an influence on their work.

Ivan's Childhood has an approval rating of 100% on review aggregator website Rotten Tomatoes, based on 24 reviews, and an average rating of 8.9/10.The website's critical consensus states, "Ostensibly an atypical Tarkovsky work (less than 100 minutes!), Ivan's Childhood carries the poetry and passion that would characterize the director from here on".

Film restoration
In 2016 the film was digitally restored. The newest version was highly praised by The Independent who called it "The most lyrical war movie ever made pristinely restored".

See also
List of submissions to the 36th Academy Awards for Best Foreign Language Film
List of Soviet submissions for the Academy Award for Best Foreign Language Film

References

External links
Ivan’s Childhood (Full length film in Russian, with English subtitles) on MosFilm Youtube channel

The short story Ivan by Vladimir Bogomolov 
Ivan’s Childhood: Dream Come True an essay by Dina Iordanova at the Criterion Collection
Cinema Then, Cinema Now: Ivan's Childhood a 1986 discussion of the film hosted by Jerry Carlson of CUNY TV

1962 films
1962 war films
1960s Russian-language films
1960s war drama films
Soviet black-and-white films
Soviet war drama films
Russian war drama films
Eastern Front of World War II films
Films about child soldiers
Films about orphans
Films based on short fiction
Films set in the 1940s
Films shot in Moscow Oblast
Films shot in Ukraine
Films directed by Andrei Tarkovsky
Golden Lion winners
Mosfilm films
1962 directorial debut films
1962 drama films
Russian black-and-white films
Russian World War II films
Soviet World War II films
Films set in Berlin
Films set in the Soviet Union
Films about Nazi Germany
Films about the Soviet Union in the Stalin era